Allan Linguet (born 17 August 1999) is a French professional footballer who plays a defender for Valenciennes FC.

Club career
Linguet made his professional debut with Valenciennes in a 2–1 Ligue 2 tie with Chamois Niortais F.C. on 26 April 2019.

References

External links

1999 births
Living people
People from Sèvres
French footballers
Association football defenders
Valenciennes FC players
Ligue 2 players
Championnat National 3 players